Antonio Piccolo (born 7 April 1988) is an Italian footballer who plays as an attacking midfielder.

Career
Born in Naples, Campania, Piccolo started his career at Campania club Salernitana Sport. After the club went bankrupt in 2005, he was signed by Serie B club Piacenza. Despite young age, he made his Serie B debut on 8 April 2006 (round 36). He substituted Daniele Degano in added time. That match Piacenza won Brescia 3–1. He played his first start on round 40 (3rd round counted from bottom) which he was replaced by Degano at second half. That match Piacenza lost to Triestina 3–4. He wore no.18 shirt from 2005 to 2008, no.19 in 2009–10 Serie B and no.23 in 2010–11 Serie B.

He was loaned to Lega Pro Prima Divisione club Foggia on 1 September 2008. On 1 July 2009, he returned to Piacenza and made a few substitute appearances. However, he was injured, trained separately and returned to the team in March. Piccolo played his first start of the 2010–11 Serie B season on 16 October 2010, as one of the forwards in a 4–3–2–1 formation, partnering with central forward Daniele Cacia and supportive striker Mattia Graffiedi. In that match Piacenza defeated Crotone with the winning goal of Piccolo.

On 31 August 2011 Piccolo was sold to Livorno for €100,000 in co-ownership deal, co-currently Piacenza got half of the registration rights of Francesco Volpe for a peppercorn of €500. After the bankruptcy of Piacenza, Livorno got the full registration rights. Piccolo left for Lanciano in January 2013. In June 2013 Lanciano acquired Piccolo in a new co-ownership deal.

On 3 October 2020 his contract with Cremonese was terminated by mutual consent. He successively joined Serie C's Catania as a free transfer.

On 9 April 2022, he was released together with all of his Catania teammates following the club's exclusion from Italian football due to its inability to overcome a number of financial issues.

References

External links
 FIGC 
 La Gazzetta dello Sport (2006–07 season) 
 La Gazzetta dello Sport (2009–10 season) 
 Football.it Profile 
 
 Piacenza Profile 

Italian footballers
Serie B players
Serie C players
U.S. Salernitana 1919 players
Piacenza Calcio 1919 players
Calcio Foggia 1920 players
U.S. Livorno 1915 players
S.S. Virtus Lanciano 1924 players
Spezia Calcio players
U.S. Cremonese players
Catania S.S.D. players
Association football forwards
Footballers from Naples
1988 births
Living people